Jacques "Jac" Berrocal (born 22 October 1946, Saint-Jean d'Angély) is a French trumpeter, singer and composer. He has been active since the 1970s in the independent and avant-garde music scene, and has released many albums. He also founded and performed in the group Catalogue, and has collaborated with Ron Anderson. Berrocal has appeared in several films.

Select discography
Berrocal
 1964, "Be-Bop-a-Lula", 45rpm
 1973, Musiq Musik, LP (2019, Rotorelief) 
 1976, Parallèles, LP (2019, Rotorelief) 
 1979, Catalogue, LP (2019, Rotorelief)
 1992, CD, La nuit est au courant
 1996, Hotel Hotel, LP
 1996, ROCK'n ROLL STATION, VINCE TAYLOR & JAC BERROCAL, 45rpm
 1997, Oblique Sessions, CD (with Pierre Bastien, Pascal Comelade and Jaki Liebezeit)
 1999, Flash, 33rpm 10"
 2002, Prières, 33rpm 10"
 2008, Marie-Antoinette is not dead
 2011, Superdisque, CD, LP (with David Fenech and Ghédalia Tazartès) 
 2014, MDLV, CD, LP
 2015, Antigravity, CD, LP (with David Fenech and Vincent Epplay)
 2017, Why, EP (with David Fenech and Vincent Epplay)
 2019, Ice Exposure, LP, CD (with David Fenech and Vincent Epplay)
 2019, 1973-1976-1979, Musiq Musik LP, Parallèles LP, Catalogue LP, Box set + Book Rotorelief
 2020, Fallen Chrome, CD, (with Riverdog), nato
 2020, Xmas in March, LP (with David Fenech and Jason Willett)
 2021, Exterior Lux, LP, CD (with David Fenech and Vincent Epplay)

Catalogue (Band)
 1979, Catalogue : Antwerpen Live, LP
 1982, Catalogue : Pénétration, LP+Maxi
 1987, Catalogue : Insomnie, LP
 1987, Catalogue : Pas touch, 45rpm
 2010, Catalogue''' : Brussels Live, LP

Video-Adventures
 1979, VIDEO-AVENTURES: CAMERA IN FOCUS, CAMERA AL RIPARO

Filmography
 Les Chants de Bataille - Jac Berrocal, a film by Guy Girard, 47’ 2004?

Actor in feature-length films
 1971, Hare Rama Hare Krishna, dir. Dev Anand
 1992, Confessions d'un Barjo, dir. Jérôme Boivin
 1984, Diesel, dir. Robert Kramer
 1985, Rouge Baiser, dir. Véra Belmont
 1987, Irina et les ombres, dir. Alain Robak
 1987, Agent trouble, dir. Jean-Pierre Mocky
 1987, Le Miraculé'', dir. Jean-Pierre Mocky

References

External links
Interview with Dan Warburton, 13 April 2004
Presentation of the album Paralelles by Bagatellen

French male singers
1946 births
Living people
French jazz trumpeters
Male trumpeters
French jazz singers
French experimental musicians
21st-century trumpeters
21st-century French male musicians
French male jazz musicians